Infrasonic passive seismic spectroscopy (IPSS) is a passive seismic low frequency technique used for mapping potential oil and gas hydrocarbon accumulations.

It is part of the geophysical techniques also known under the generic naming passive seismic which includes also passive seismic tomography and micro seismic monitoring for petroleum, gas, and geothermal applications. In a larger scale, passive seismic includes the Global Seismic Network (GSN) earthquake monitoring.

Regarding petroleum and geothermal exploration (within a small scale), the effect of fluid distribution on P-wave propagation in partially saturated rocks is responsible for the low frequency reservoir-related wavefield absorption.
 
The high level of attenuation within the infrasonic bandwidth (below 10 Hz) of the seismic field observed in natural oil-saturated porous media during the last years (explained by mesoscopic homogeneous models) is the main responsible of the passive seismic wave field shifting within a low frequency range.
 
Pressure differences between regions with different fluid/solid properties induce frequency-dependency of the attenuation (Qp and Qs reservoir factors) and velocity dispersion (Vp, Vs) of the low frequency wave field.

Infrasonic passive seismic spectroscopy quantifies the absorption and the wave field dispersion within the low frequency bandwidth giving the most predominant areas linked with possible oil-saturated and porous media.

The low frequency seismic field is not usually reachable by the active seismic surveys being either the explosive waves mainly in the high frequency and the vibroseis currently built not to reach such a low frequencies.

References

Further reading 
Quintal B.,. Frequency-dependent attenuation as a potential indicator of oil saturation Journal of Applied Geophysics 82, pp. 119–128, 2012.
Lambert M.-A., Saenger E.H., Quintal B., Schmalholz S.M.,. Numerical simulation of ambient seismic wavefield modification caused by pore-fluid effects in an oil reservoir Geophysics 78, pp. T41-T52, 2013.

Artman, B., I. Podladtchikov, and B. Witten, 2010, Source location using time-reverse imaging. Geophysical Prospecting, 58, 861–873.

Biot M. A. 1956a,. Theory of propagation of elastic waves in a fluid-saturated porous solid: Part1—Low-frequency range Journal of the Acoustical Society of America, 28, 168–178.

Biot M.A. 1956b,. Theory of propagation of elastic waves in a fluid-saturated porous solid: Part2—Higher frequency range Journal of the Acoustical Society ofAmerica, 28, 179–191.

Biot M.A. 1962. Mechanics of deformation and acoustic propagation in porous media Journal of Applied Physics 33, 1482–1498.

Carcione, J. M., H. B. Helle, and N. H. Pham (2003),: White’s model for wave propagation in partially saturated rocks Comparison with poroelastic numerical experiments.  Geophysics, 68, 1389– 1398.

Dutta, N. C., and H. Ode, 1979a,: Attenuation and dispersion of compressional-waves in fluid-filled rocks with partial gas saturation White model: Part 1—Biot theory Geophysics, 44, 1777–1788.

Pride S.R. and Berryman J.G. 2003. Linear dynamics of double porosity and dual-permeability materials. I. Governing equations and acoustic attenuation Physical Review E 68, 036604.

Rubino, J. G., C. L. Ravazzoli, and J. E. Santos, 2009,: Equivalent viscoelastic solids for heterogeneous fluid-saturated porous rocks Geophysics, 74, no. 1, N1–N13.

Riahi, N., B. Birkelo, and E. H. Saenger, 2011,: A statistical strategy to analyzing passive seismic attributes 73rd Annual Conference and Exhibition, EAGE, Extended Abstracts, P198.

Akrawi, K., Campagna, F., Russo, L., Yousif, M. E., Abdelhafeez, M. H.,: Passive seismic survey results identified potential prospects in Sudan Abstract:  10th Middle East Geosciences Conference and Exhibition, EAGE, Article: #90141©2012 GEO-2012,

Artman, B., M. Duclos, B. Birkelo, F. Huguet, J. F. Dutzer, and R. Habiger, 2011, Low-frequency seismic survey at a gas storage reservoir: 73rd Annual Conference and Exhibition, EAGE, Extended Abstracts, P331.

Lambert, M.-A., S. M. Schmalholz, E. H. Saenger, and B. Steiner, 2009,: Low-frequency microtremor anomalies at an oil and gas field in Voitsdorf, AustriaGeophysical Prospecting, 57, 393–411.

Steiner, B., E. H. Saenger, and S. M. Schmalholz, 2008,: Time reverse modeling of low-frequency microtremors Application to hydrocarbon reservoir localization: Geophysical Research Letters, 35, L03307.

Toms, J., 2008. Effect of Fluid Distribution on Compressional Wave Propagation in Partially Saturated Rocks. PhD Thesis.

White J.E., Mikhaylova N.G. and Lyakhovitskiy F.M. 1976. Low frequency seismic waves in fluid-saturated layered rocks Izvestija Academy of Sciences USSR, Physics Solid Earth 11, 654–659.

External links
 Summary of the theoretical background of the passive seismic.

Oil exploration
Seismology measurement